Baldwin the Eagle, an anthropomorphized bald eagle, is the mascot of the Boston College Eagles.

The nickname "Eagles" goes back to 1920 when Rev. Edward McLaughlin, unhappy at seeing a newspaper cartoon which represented Boston College as a cat after a track victory, wrote to the college newspaper The Heights:

Costumed mascot
By the time Margo (BC's live eagle mascot) died in 1966, eagles had become endangered species and the university then opted to go to a costumed mascot. In 2000, with the unveiling of the current athletics logos, the Boston College Eagle mascot received a visual makeover as well and has appeared that way since. Also, the mascot officially got the name "Baldwin"—a combination of the words "Bald" (as in bald eagle) and "win." There is also a 9.5 foot inflatable mascot named "Baldwin, Jr." which appears at games. Like many modern costumed mascots, Baldwin wears replica team uniforms at events.

Baldwin the Eagle is brought to life by an anonymous team of Boston College students that are chosen by audition. Previous Baldwins, now retired, include Tommy Mazza, David Sullivan, Jonathan Shen, Andre Glascock, Ben Yoch.

Live birds-of-prey
The "Eagles" nickname stuck. Soon a pair of golden eagles from Texas and New Mexico were given to the college as gifts. However, one escaped and the other broke its beak trying. For the next four years, the official "mascot" was a stuffed golden eagle located in the athletic offices.

In 1961, another attempt was made at a live mascot when the college adopted a 10-month-old golden eagle named "Margo" (so named because the team colors are maroon and gold). Margo lived at the Franklin Park Zoo and was brought to all home games for several years until dying of a virus early in the 1966 season.

In 2013, new athletic director Brad Bates brought back the live eagle tradition, bringing in an eagle during half time of football games. After a fan contest to decide what to call the Eagle, it was named "Welles" after Welles Crowther, the hero who died helping others during the September 11 attacks; a BC alum. Welles made sparing appearances in 2013 and 2014, sometimes not being able to attend the games due to inclement weather, late start times, etc.

Gilded statue

Another notable incarnation of the Boston College Eagle is a gilded bronze eagle sculpture that diplomat Larz Anderson and Isabel Weld Perkins, his socialite heiress wife, brought back from Japan in the early 20th century. The eagle remained in Larz Anderson Park until 1954 when it was donated to Boston College and became synonymous with the BC Eagle. It now looks over Linden Lane.

See also
List of U.S. college mascots

References



Boston College Eagles
Atlantic Coast Conference mascots
Fictional birds of prey